"To da Break of Dawn" is a single from both LL Cool J's fourth album, Mama Said Knock You Out, and the soundtrack to the Kid 'n Play movie House Party. The song was released on June 17, 1990 by Motown Records and Def Jam Recordings.

Background
The song was a diss to LL's rivals at the time, Kool Moe Dee, MC Hammer, and Ice-T. Kool Moe Dee responded with the song "Death Blow" from their 1991 album Funke, Funke Wisdom. However, LL would reference the rivalry in the 1995 remix to I Shot Ya, a B-side from his sixth album Mr. Smith.

"To da Break of Dawn" was ranked #11 on XXL magazine's 2015 list of the top 20 diss songs of all time. The song had a similar sound to the growing new jack swing genre. The song peaked at #17 on the Hot Rap Singles chart. Additionally, the song's lyrics were sampled in other 1990's hip-hop songs, such as "No Vaseline" by Ice Cube, "Who's Gonna Take the Weight?" by Gang Starr, and "Partner to Swing" by Chino XL.

Track listing

A-Side
"To Da Break Of Dawn" (Bug Out Mix)- 4:30 
"To Da Break Of Dawn" (Remix Version)- 5:30

B-Side
"To Da Break Of Dawn" (LP Version)- 4:27 
"To Da Break Of Dawn" (Instrumental)- 4:28

Sampled in 
"To da Break of Dawn" was sampled in several other songs following its release. These include: 

 "No Vaseline" by Ice Cube
 "Check the Technique" by Gang Starr
 "Who's Gonna Take the Weight?" by Gang Starr
 "Love On My Mind" by Xscape 
 "Partner to Swing" by Chino XL

References

1990 singles
LL Cool J songs
Songs written by LL Cool J
1990 songs
Motown singles
Def Jam Recordings singles
Song recordings produced by Marley Marl
Diss tracks